Epideira beachportensis is a species of sea snail, a marine gastropod mollusk in the family Horaiclavidae.

Description

Distribution

References

External links
 Cotton B.C. & Godfrey F.K. (1938). New species of the South Australian Gastropoda. Records of the South Australian Museum. 6: 199–206, pl. 17.

beachportensis
Gastropods described in 1938